Nalita may refer to:

 Trema orientalis, a flowering tree in the hemp family
 Mulukhiya, leaves of the jute plant used as a vegetable